Onotoa Airport  is the airport serving Onotoa.

The airport is served twice a week by Air Kiribati from Bonriki, on Tarawa, with a stop in Tabiteuea North.

Airlines and destinations

Référence

Notes

Airports in Kiribati
Gilbert Islands